Adriana Castillo Herrera (born 5 May 1990) is a Uruguayan footballer who plays as a forward for Club Nacional de Football and the Uruguay women's national team.

Club career
Castillo played in Chile for Colo-Colo.

International career
Castillo played for Uruguay in three Copa América Femenina editions (2010, 2014 and 2018).

References 

1990 births
Living people
Women's association football forwards
Uruguayan women's footballers
Footballers from Montevideo
Uruguay women's international footballers
Colo-Colo (women) footballers
C.A. Cerro players
Club Nacional de Football players
Uruguayan expatriate women's footballers
Uruguayan expatriate sportspeople in Chile
Expatriate women's footballers in Chile